Akampadam  is a town in Malappuram district in the state of Kerala, India.

Demographics
 India census, Akampadam had a population of 15758 with 7616 males and 8142 females.

Transportation
Akampadam village connects to other parts of India through Nilambur town.  State Highway No.28 starts from Nilambur and connects to Ooty, Mysore and Bangalore through Highways.12,29 and 181. National highway No.66 passes through Ramanattukara and the northern stretch connects to Goa and Mumbai.  The southern stretch connects to Cochin and Trivandrum.   State.  The nearest airport is at Kozhikode.  The nearest major railway station is at nilambur.

Terrorist Links
Some Islamic terrorist groups are connected with Athikkad village near Akampadam.  Police are investigating their connection with Islamic State or I.S.Organization.

References

Villages in Malappuram district
Nilambur area